Jonathan Dayton (October 16, 1760October 9, 1824) was an American Founding Father and politician from the U.S. state of New Jersey. He was the youngest person to sign the Constitution of the United States and a member of the United States House of Representatives, serving as its third speaker, and later in the U.S. Senate. Dayton was arrested in 1807 for treason in connection with Aaron Burr's conspiracy. He was never tried, but his national political career never recovered.

Biography

Early life
Dayton was born in Elizabethtown (now known as Elizabeth), New Jersey. He was the son of Elias Dayton, a merchant who was prominent in local politics and had served as a militia officer in the French and Indian War, and his wife the former Hannah Rolfe. He graduated from the local academy, run by Tapping Reeve and Francis Barber, where he was classmates with Alexander Hamilton. He then attended the College of New Jersey (now known as Princeton University). He left college in 1775 to fight in the American Revolutionary War and received an honorary degree in 1776.

Soldier
Dayton was 15 at the outbreak of the war in 1775 and served under his father in the 3rd New Jersey Regiment as an ensign. On January 1, 1777, he was commissioned a lieutenant and served as paymaster. He saw service under General George Washington, fighting in the battles of Brandywine Creek and Germantown. He remained with Washington at Valley Forge and helped push the British from their position in New Jersey into the safety of New York City. In October 1780, Dayton and an uncle were captured by Loyalists, who held them captive for the winter before releasing them in the following year. Dayton again served under his father in the New Jersey Brigade. On March 30, 1780, at age 19, he was promoted to the rank of captain and transferred to the 2nd New Jersey Regiment, where he took part in the Battle of Yorktown. The Revolutionary War pension records indicate that he served as aide-de-camp to General John Sullivan on his expedition against the Indians from May 1 to November 30, 1779.

At the close of the Revolutionary War, Dayton was admitted as an original member of The Society of the Cincinnati in the state of New Jersey. On July 19, 1799, Dayton was offered a commission as major general in the Provisional United States Army, but he declined.

Career
After the war, Dayton studied law and created a practice, dividing his time between land speculation, law, and politics. After serving as a New Jersey delegate to the Continental Congress and Constitutional Convention (of which he was the youngest member, at age 26), he became a prominent Federalist legislator. He was a member of the New Jersey General Assembly in 1786–1787, and again in 1790, and served in the New Jersey Legislative Council (now the New Jersey Senate) in 1789.

Dayton was elected to the U.S. House of Representatives in 1789, but he did not take his seat until he was chosen again in 1791. He served as speaker for the Fourth and Fifth Congresses. Like most Federalists, he supported the fiscal policies of Alexander Hamilton, and he helped organize the suppression of the Whiskey Rebellion. He supported the Louisiana Purchase and opposed the repeal of the Judiciary Act of 1801.

Wealthy from his heavy investments in Ohio, where the city of Dayton would later be named after him, Dayton lent money to Aaron Burr, becoming involved by association in the alleged conspiracy in which Burr was accused of intending to conquer parts of what is now the Southwestern United States. Dayton was exonerated, but his association with Burr effectively ended his political career.

Late life and family
Dayton married Susan Williamson in 1779 and had two daughters.

After resuming his political career in New Jersey, Dayton died on October 9, 1824, in his hometown. He was interred in an unmarked grave that is now under the St. John's Episcopal Church in Elizabeth, New Jersey, which replaced an original church in 1860. Shortly before Dayton's death, Lafayette visited him, as reported in an obituary in the Columbian Centinel on October 20, 1824: "In New-Jersey, Hon. JONATHAN DAYTON, formerly Speaker of the House of Representatives of Congress, and a Hero of the Revolution. When the Nation's Guest lately passed New-Jersey, he passed the night with General Dayton, and such were the exertions of this aged and distinguished federalist, to honor the Guest, and gratify the wishes of his fellow citizens to see, that he sunk under them; and expired, without regret, a few days after."

Legacy
The city of Dayton, Ohio, was named after him. While he never visited the area, he was a signatory to the Constitution and, at the time the city of Dayton was established in 1796, he owned (in partnership with Arthur St. Clair, James Wilkinson and Israel Ludlow) 250,000 acres (1,011 km²) in the Great Miami River basin. The Jonathan Dayton High School in Springfield Township, Union County, New Jersey, the Dayton neighborhood of Newark, New Jersey, Dayton Street in Madison, Wisconsin, and Dayton, New Jersey, are named in his honor.

References

External links

 Jonathan Dayton at The Political Graveyard
 
 The Society of the Cincinnati
 American Revolution Institute

1760 births
1824 deaths
American Revolutionary War prisoners of war held by Great Britain
Continental Army officers from New Jersey
Continental Congressmen from New Jersey
18th-century American politicians
Speakers of the United States House of Representatives
Signers of the United States Constitution
Princeton University alumni
Politicians from Elizabeth, New Jersey
Members of the New Jersey General Assembly
Speakers of the New Jersey General Assembly
Members of the New Jersey Legislative Council
United States senators from New Jersey
Federalist Party United States senators
American Episcopalians
History of Dayton, Ohio
Federalist Party members of the United States House of Representatives from New Jersey
People of colonial New Jersey
Burials in New Jersey
Founding Fathers of the United States